Anne Lindsay or Lindsey may refer to:

 Lady Anne Barnard, née Anne Lindsay, writer and socialite
Anne Crawford-Lindsay, noblewoman
Anne Lindsey, fictional character in Highlander
Anne Lindsay; see Fuse (radio program)

See also
Anna Robertson Brown Lindsay, academic
Anna Lindsay (activist) (1845–1903), Scottish women's activist